Live & Early Singles is a compilation album released on February 17, 2004, by the Washington, D.C.-based go-go band Trouble Funk. The album consists of a compilation of the band's earlier singles from the late-1970s to the early-1980s.

Track listing

Personnel

James Avery – electronic keyboards
Mack Carey – percussions
Chester Davis – guitar
Tony Fisher – bass guitar
Emmett Nixon – drums
Gerald Reed – trombone
Robert Reed – keyboards, trombone
Taylor Reed – trumpet
David Rudd – tenor saxophone
Daniel Hersch – remastering
Bill Inglot – remastering

References

External links
Live & Early Singles at Discogs

2004 compilation albums
Trouble Funk albums
Rhythm and blues compilation albums